Jacob Keidar (born 1956) has been the Israeli Ambassador to Switzerland and Liechtenstein since 2016. Keidar has also served as Consul general in Shanghai and Ambassador to Kenya, accredited to Uganda, Seychelles, Tanzania, Malawi and Zambia (2007–2011,

References

Israeli consuls
Ambassadors of Israel to Switzerland
Ambassadors of Israel to Kenya
Ambassadors of Israel to Seychelles
Ambassadors of Israel to Zambia
Ambassadors of Israel to Uganda
Ambassadors of Israel to Liechtenstein
Ambassadors of Israel to Malawi
Ambassadors of Israel to Tanzania
1956 births
Living people